John McHenry may refer to:

 John Geiser McHenry (1868–1912), United States Representative from Pennsylvania
 John H. McHenry (1797–1871), United States Representative from Kentucky